"80s Mercedes" is a song recorded by American country music singer Maren Morris. It was released in June 2016 as her second single. She co-wrote and co-produced the song with busbee during a session where they traded ideas about its title and the numerous influences from that era. "80s Mercedes" peaked at numbers 11 and 12 on both the Billboard Hot Country Songs and Country Airplay charts respectively. Also, it reached number 74 on the Hot 100. The song was certified Gold by the Recording Industry Association of America (RIAA), and has sold 236,000 units in the United States as of January 2017. It also charted in Canada, peaking at number 17 on the Canada Country chart. It received a Gold certification from Music Canada, denoting sales of 40,000 units in that country. The accompanying music video for the song was directed by Alon Isocianu.

Background
According to Morris, the inspiration for the song came from a conversation with Audra Mae, who used the phrase "80s Mercedes" in their conversation and she thought it would be a good title for a song. She mentioned the idea to Busbee at their song-writing session, and Busbee started asking Morris questions for possible directions on the writing. One of those questions was: "What year were you born?". Morris answered 1990, and Busbee then came out with the line: "I'm a '90s baby in my '80s Mercedes" which became the hook for the song. The song has some influences from 1980s songs, and contains an oblique reference to Don Henley's song "The Boys of Summer".

Music video
The music video was directed by Alon Isocianu and premiered in August 2016. The vehicle featured was a 1980s era Mercedes Benz 380 SL.

Critical reception
"80s Mercedes" was placed at number 38 on Rolling Stone’s "50 Best Songs of 2016", stating: “The Nashville breakout star is writing cooler car songs than anyone else these days – she's a "Nineties baby in an Eighties Mercedes," blasting Hank Williams and Johnny Cash on her radio.”

Accolades

Chart performance
In the United States, the song has reached number 11 on the Hot Country Songs chart. It entered the Country Airplay chart at number 53 and has since reached number 12. It also debuted at number 91 on the US Billboard Hot 100 chart for the week and also debuted at number 17 on Canada Country chart for the week of November 25, 2016.

The song has sold 236,000 copies as of January 2017.

Charts

Weekly charts

Year-end charts

Certifications

References

2016 singles
2016 songs
Maren Morris songs
Columbia Nashville Records singles
Songs written by busbee
Song recordings produced by busbee
American pop rock songs
Songs written by Maren Morris
Songs about cars
Mercedes-Benz